Alhaji Ali (also Ali bin Umar) was Mai (ruler) of the Bornu Empire, in what is now the African states of Chad, Nigeria, and Niger, from 1639 to around 1680. Ali succeeded his father Umar in 1639 and had a relatively long reign. During the early years of his reign, the empire was threatened with incursions from its neighbors, the Tuareg in the north and the Kwararafa in the south. He was able to hold both forces at bay and finally defeated them in 1668. After his victory, he consolidated his kingdom, controlling the vital trans-Saharan trade routes, and rekindling Islamic teaching in the empire. He is remembered for his piety, constructing four mosques and making three Hajj pilgrimages to Mecca.

References

H. J. Fisher. "The Sahara and the Central Sudan" in The Cambridge History of Africa: From c.1600 to c.1790. Richard Gray, J. D. Fage, Roland Anthony Oliver, eds. Cambridge University Press, (1975) 

17th-century monarchs in Africa
Rulers of the Bornu Empire
17th-century Nigerian people